Pleckstrin homology domain-containing family A member 1 is a protein that in humans is encoded by the PLEKHA1 gene.

Interactions 

PLEKHA1 has been shown to interact with MPDZ.

References

Further reading